Wish Films (formerly Tell-Tale Productions) is an animation and live-action studio, established by Will Brenton and Iain Lauchlan in 1994. The company first produced live shows, and later went on to produce TV shows.

History

As Tell-Tale Productions
On September 14, 2001, Tell-Tale signed a deal with Gullane Entertainment for the production on two new shows, called Ella, and Sprogs, with the latter company distributing the series. 

On July 26, 2002, the BBC picked up the UK broadcasting rights to Boo! for a broadcast in September 2003. On September 1, it was announced that Universal Pictures had acquired worldwide distribution rights to the series.

On September 18, 2002, Tell-Tale announced the production of a cross 2D/3D series titled WARP. On the same day, it was confirmed that the distribution rights to Ella and Sprogs reverted to Tell-Tale after the deal with Gullane fell through due to HIT Entertainment's purchase of Gullane, alongside the production on two 60-minute direct-to-video Tweenies specials.

On February 1, 2003, the company signed a property management deal with LMI for Sprogs, alongside a deal with BBC Music to allow music production for the series, which would air in Early 2004.

On January 27, 2004, Carlton International acquired distribution rights to Sprogs. The company purchased the video rights in all regions except for the US and French-speaking territories, and worldwide TV rights excluding the UK, the US, and French and German-speaking territories. It was also confirmed that CBBC had acquired the UK broadcast rights to the series for a Fall 2004 broadcast date.

On September 13, 2004, Entertainment Rights announced they would acquire Tell-Tale for £3.1 million. The buyout would include the rights to Sprogs, which had by then been renamed BB3B (previously handled by Carlton) and would be broadcast during the winter of 2005, alongside the rights to a new reboot of Fun Song Factory for air on CITV. The Tweenies property was retained by BBC Worldwide although Entertainment Rights would gain royalty income for the property, alongside rights to a planned feature-movie adaptation to the property.  The purchase was completed on October 1, 2004.

On December 20, 2005, ITV acquired the broadcast rights to Jim Jam and Sunny for broadcast on the then-new CITV Channel, and that production would start in 2006, being the largest broadcast deal made by ITV for a children's series.

Reformation as Wish Films
In 2006, Tell-Tale was purchased out in a management buyout by Will Brenton and Iain Lauchlan, and was re-formed as Wish Films. The company continued a partnership with Entertainment Rights for Jim Jam and Sunny, which premiered on CITV later on in the year.

In 2008, Wish produced their first international co-production, a TV adaptation of Wibbly Pig with Canadian-based 9 Story Entertainment, with the latter holding North and Latin American distribution rights, and BBC Worldwide holding all other international rights.

On May 6, 2010, CBeebies announced a new show from Wish to air in the channel's summer schedule called Mighty-Mites, presented by Sarah-Jane Honeywell.

Other shows produced by Wish around these time frames are Florrie's Dragons, a co-production with Studio 100, and Melody.

Filmography

As Tell-Tale Productions
 1998: Fun Song Factory
 1999: Wow! That's What I Call Nursery Rhymes/Christmas!
 1999: Tweenies
 2003: WARP (CGI/2D animated pilot)
 2003: Jim Jam (animated pilot of Jim Jam and Sunny)
 2003: Boo!
 2003: Tweenies - Night-Time Magic (direct-to-video special)
 2004: Tweenies - Jungle Adventure (direct-to-video special)
 2004: Fun Song Factory (Reboot)
 2005: BB3B (originally called "Sprogs" in 2003 pilot)

As Wish Films
 2006: Jim Jam and Sunny
 2009: Wibbly Pig
 2010: Mighty Mites
 2010: Florrie's Dragons
 2013: Melody

Live Shows
Fun Song Factory (1994-1997) 
CBeebies Live (2005-2015)
Thomas & Friends: The Big Live Tour/The All Aboard Live Tour (2002-2006)
Tweenies Live (2000-2001)
Tweenies Live: The Christmas Present (2001-2002, 2003)
Tweenies Live 2: The Fab-a-Rooney Tour (2002)
Tweenies Live: No Sleep 'till Bedtime (2005)

References

1994 establishments in England
Children's theatre
DreamWorks Classics
Theatre companies in the United Kingdom